Gan is a commune located in the Pyrénées-Atlantiques department, in the south-west of France. Gan station has rail connections to Pau, Oloron-Sainte-Marie and Bedous.

Its mayor has been Mr Francis Pèes (Right Wing ; also Vice President of the Communauté d'agglomération de Pau-Pyrénées) since 2014, a former CEO of a construction company.

Population

See also
Communes of the Pyrénées-Atlantiques department

References

Communes of Pyrénées-Atlantiques